Tuan Tuan and Yuan Yuan were two giant pandas that were gifted by the People's Republic of China (PRC, mainland China) to the Republic of China (ROC, Taiwan) in 2008 as part of a cultural exchange program. The idea was first proposed in 2005, but the previous ROC administration in Taipei had initially refused to accept the pandas.

After elections that resulted in a change of president and the government in 2008, the ROC government accepted the pandas, and they arrived on December 23, 2008. One of the most significant positive cross-strait relations in the early 21st century, the two names were selected by a vote in the PRC and their combination, Tuan Yuan, means "reunion"  in the Chinese language. The pandas are housed at Taipei Zoo and have been exhibited to the public since the 2009 Chinese New Year. One of the pandas, Tuan Tuan, died in November 2022.

Birth 
Tuan Tuan, male, was born to Hua Mei on September 1, 2004, and was assigned as no. 19 in the Wolong National Nature Reserve in Sichuan. Yuan Yuan, female, was born on August 31, 2004, and was assigned as no. 16 in the Wolong National Nature Reserve. Their names, "Tuan Tuan" and "Yuan Yuan", were chosen in an unofficial public poll in mainland China the results of which were revealed live on national television during the 2006 CCTV New Year's Gala. Approximately 130 million mainland Chinese viewers cast their votes. Together, the names produce the Chinese phrase tuan yuan, meaning "reunion".

Proposal, initial resistance and acceptance 

The exchange of the pandas was first proposed during the 2005 Pan-Blue visits to mainland China, when politicians from the then-Opposition Pan-Blue coalition, which is comparatively pro-unification in stance, visited mainland China. Chen Yunlin, then the head of the State Council Taiwan Affairs Office, announced on May 3, 2005, that Beijing would present two giant pandas to Taipei as part of an exchange program.

The two pandas to be sent to Taiwan were chosen after 218 days of observation and discussion by experts from both mainland China and Taiwan, and were officially announced on January 6, 2006. The Chinese Wildlife Protection Society then began seeking nominations for the names to be given to the pair of pandas. These were announced on the eve of Chinese New Year, 2006 on the CCTV New Year's Gala live on national television. An opinion survey in Taiwan conducted by United Daily News in response to the exchange proposal found 50% of respondents in favour of accepting the pandas, and 34% opposed.

However, the exchange proposal soon met political resistance from the Democratic Progressive Party (DPP). On March 31, 2006, the Agricultural Committee of the Executive Yuan in Taiwan decided not to issue permits for the importation, ostensibly on the grounds that the zoos in Taiwan applying for the importation did not meet facility and resource requirements for the proper care and rearing of the pandas, and that importation would not be in the best interest of protecting pandas. However, commentators generally observed that political considerations underlay the technical decision, with the independence-leaning President Chen Shui-bian being opposed to what he saw as a propaganda move by Beijing.

In 2008, Ma Ying-jeou, of the Kuomintang (KMT), was elected president, and over the next few months forged stronger economic and political relations with mainland China under his presidency, and was willing to accept them. The offering of pandas a gift from mainland China is often known as "panda diplomacy", and Taipei Zoo expects to draw around 30,000 visitors a day as a result of their arrival. The move was criticized by supporters of Taiwan's independence and the opposition Democratic Progressive Party, who said that "Tuan Tuan and Yuan Yuan means a union, which perfectly matches Beijing's goal of bringing Taiwan into its fold."

Although Taiwan is not a CITES signatory and is therefore not obligated to report to the CITES Secretariat, the Secretariat of CITES said in response to the transfer that it viewed the transfer as an intrastate matter, and thus would be governed by whatever procedures and documentary requirements that are agreed upon by the Beijing and Taipei authorities. Both sides adopted procedures similar to standard CITES procedures for international transfers. On the import-export permits, the origin was listed as the Wolong Nature Reserve Management Office, while the destination was listed as the Taipei City Zoo.

Arrival in Taiwan and reaction 

Tuan Tuan and Yuan Yuan arrived in Taiwan aboard an EVA Air flight on December 23, 2008, and were transported to Taipei Zoo. The arrival of the pandas was met with intense public attention, described by the press as "Pandamania", with the pandas becoming instant celebrities. A variety of merchandise has already appeared, with even buses redecorated in panda-themed livery.

At the same time, there has also been political controversy. The opposition DPP continues to see the pandas as a propaganda move by Beijing.

Health

Tuan Tuan
In October 2022, it was reported that one of the pandas, Tuan Tuan, was suffering from a serious health condition in his brain. In response, the ROC government (under DPP control since 2016) sought help and invited veterinary experts from mainland China to assess Tuan Tuan's situation as he moved into end-of-life care. Tuan Tuan was euthanized on November 19, 2022, after suffering multiple seizures brought on by lesions on his brain.

Offspring 

Yuan Yuan gave birth to a cub on July 6, 2013, at the Taipei Zoo. The female cub was nicknamed Yuan Zai (also pronounced in Taiwanese Hokkien as Inn-a). Yuan Zai has several meanings: rice ball, and also '(Yuan) Yuan's child'. On October 26, at the zoo's 99th anniversary ceremony, the baby panda was officially named Yuan Zai after a naming activity that saw 60% of the votes go to the cub's nickname. She was also presented an honorary citizen's card on that day. As Tuan Tuan and Yuan Yuan were sent to Taiwan in exchange for two Formosan sika deer and two Taiwan serows, the cub does not need to be returned.

On June 28, 2020, a second cub was born at the Taipei zoo. This cub was named Yuan Bao.

See also 
 Panda diplomacy – Offer of pandas to Taiwan

References

External links

2004 animal births
2022 animal deaths
Individual giant pandas
Taipei Zoo
Animals as diplomatic gifts
Cross-Strait relations